Sir Muhammad Iqbal also known as Allama Iqbal (1877–1938), was a Muslim philosopher, poet, writer, scholar and politician of early 20th-century. He is particularly known in the Indian sub-continent for his Urdu philosophical poetry on Islam and the need for the cultural and intellectual reconstruction of the Islamic community. He is also considered the "spiritual father of Pakistan" for inspiring the Pakistan Movement in British India. Iqbal became prominence since 1899, when he recited Nalay e Yatem at the annual meeting of Anjuman-e-Himayat-e-Islam, Lahore. The poems he wrote up to 1905, imbibe patriotism that includes the Tarana-e-Hind (popularly known as Saare Jahan Se Achcha). The Bang-e-Dara (1924) is a collection of Urdu poetry written in three distinct phases of Iqbals life, In his early work he also wrote on most of the Indian iconic personalities such as Rama Tirtha, Guru Nanak and Rama.

Style

First phase
The Urdu poetry Iqbal wrote earlier to his visit of Europe in 1905, is considered by critics as the first phase of his poetry that reflects the blend of Persian mysticism and the Patriotism.

Work

Urdu

Before poetry
Iqbal's first published work, with likely date of 1904, was an introductory economics textbook which he wrote as result of his first proper job -  teaching of history and political economy to students of Bachelor of Oriental Learning (B.O.L.) in Urdu and translation of English and Arabic works into Urdu at the University Oriental College, Lahore.:
 Iqbal, Sheikh Muhammad (n.d. but 1904 is likely) Ilmul Iqtisad [The Science of Economics]. Lahore:  Khadimul-Taleem Steam Press of Paisa Akhbar. First  2nd  edition (1961), Karachi: Iqbal Academy; Reprinted (1977), Lahore: Iqbal  Academy Pakistan; 2nd Reprint (1991), Lahore: Ain

Poetry
Iqbal's Urdu poetry collection is available in four books.

Persian 

 Asrar-i-Khudi (1915)
 Rumuz-i-Bekhudi (1918)
 Payam-i-Mashriq (1923)
 Zabur-i-Ajam (1927)
 Javid Nama (1932)
 Pas Cheh Bayed Kard ai Aqwam-e-Sharq (1936)
 Armughan-e-Hijaz (1938) (in Persian and Urdu)

Patriotic poetry
 Himalaya
 Naya Shivala
Tarana-e-Milli
Tarana-e-Hind

See also
 Index of Muhammad Iqbal–related articles

References

Further reading

 
 

 Encyclopedia Iranica, Volume-XIII, pages 197–200
 Iqbal Review 

Lists of books
Muhammad Iqbal